The governor of South Dakota is the head of government of the U.S. state of South Dakota. The current governor is Republican Kristi Noem, serving since 2019. The governor has the power to sign or veto laws, and to call the Legislative Assembly into emergency session. They have an ex officio South Dakota Governor's Residence. The governor may only serve two terms consecutively, and becomes eligible for reelection after four years out of office. South Dakota is a strongly Republican state; only six governors have not been members of that party and the governorship has been held by Republicans since 1979, the longest Republican streak and the longest overall streak of one party control in the country.

Governors of Dakota Territory

Governors of South Dakota

Succession

Notes

See also
 South Dakota
 Governor of South Dakota
 Timeline of South Dakota

South Dakota

Governors